Michael Haydn's Symphony No. 9 in D major, Perger 36, Sherman 9, MH 50, was written in Salzburg in 1766. It is the 21st D major symphony attributed to Joseph Haydn in Hoboken's catalog.

Scored for 2 oboes, 2 bassoons, 2 horns, and strings. In four movements:

 Allegro assai
 Andante, in D minor
 Minuet and Trio
 Presto assai

Note however that Sherman and other scholars believe the Minuet and Trio may have been composed by someone else.

Discography

Included in a set of 20 symphonies on the CPO label with Bohdan Warchal conducting the Slovak Philharmonic. This recording excludes the Minuet.

References
 A. Delarte, "A Quick Overview Of The Instrumental Music Of Michael Haydn" Bob's Poetry Magazine November 2006: 33 PDF
 Charles H. Sherman and T. Donley Thomas, Johann Michael Haydn (1737 - 1806), a chronological thematic catalogue of his works. Stuyvesant, New York: Pendragon Press (1993)
 C. Sherman, "Johann Michael Haydn" in The Symphony: Salzburg, Part 2 London: Garland Publishing (1982): lxiv

Symphony 09
1766 compositions
Compositions in D major